The Network of National Institutions in the Americas is one of four regional groups of national human rights institutions (NHRIs) within the global network, the International Co-ordinating Committee of NHRIs (the ICC). The Americas group, which largely consists of ombudsman agencies rather than multi-member human rights commissions, is currently chaired by the National Human Rights Commission of Mexico, which represents the region on the ICC Bureau.

Members

The full members of the Network are those national institutions deemed by the ICC to be fully compliant with the Paris Principles, so accredited with "A status": 

Argentina
 Defensoría del Pueblo de la Nación Argentina (Ombudsman)
Bolivia
 Defensor del Pueblo
Canada
 Canadian Human Rights Commission
Colombia
 Ombudsman's Office of Colombia
Costa Rica
 Defensoria de los Habitantes
Ecuador
 Defensor del Pueblo de la República de Ecuador
El Salvador
 Procuraduría de Defensa de los Derechos Humanos (El Salvador)
Guatemala
 Procurador de los Derechos Humanos (Guatemala)
Honduras
 Comisionado Nacional de los Derechos Humanos (Honduras)
Mexico
 National Human Rights Commission (Mexico)
Nicaragua
 Procuraduría para la Defensa de los Derechos Humanos de Nicaragua
Panama
 Defensoría del Pueblo de la República de Panamá
Paraguay
 Defensoría del Pueblo de la República del Paraguay
Peru
 Defensoría del Pueblo - Ombudsman (Peru)
Venezuela
 Defensoría del Pueblo

Other human rights institutions in the Americas
The following institutions are not "A" accredited by the ICC but are potentially eligible for consideration (except, under current ICC rules, Puerto Rico). Some participate alongside Network members in regional events, particularly those organized through the Ibero-American Federation of Ombudsmen (FIO).

Antigua and Barbuda
 Office of the Ombudsman
Barbados
 Office of the Ombudsman (Barbados)
Belize
 Office of the Ombudsman (Belize)
Guyana
 Office of the Ombudsman (Guyana)
Haiti
 Office de la Protection du Citoyen
Jamaica
 Office of the Public Defender (Jamaica)
Puerto Rico
 Oficina del Procurador del Ciudadano
Saint Lucia
 Office of the Parliamentary Commissioner (St Lucia)
Trinidad and Tobago
 Office of the Ombudsman of Trinidad and Tobago

See also
 Asia Pacific Forum of National Human Rights Institutions (APF)
 European Group of National Human Rights Institutions
 Human rights
 International Co-ordinating Committee of National Human Rights Institutions
 List of human rights articles by country
 Network of African National Human Rights Institutions (NANHRI)

External links
National Human Rights Institutions Forum